NSFL1 cofactor p47 is a protein that in humans is encoded by the NSFL1C gene.

N-ethylmaleimide-sensitive factor (NSF) and valosin-containing protein (p97) are two ATPases known to be involved in transport vesicle/target membrane fusion and fusions between membrane compartments. A trimer of the protein encoded by this gene binds a hexamer of cytosolic p97 and is required for p97-mediated regrowth of Golgi cisternae from mitotic Golgi fragments. Multiple transcript variants encoding several different isoforms have been found for this gene.

Interactions
NSFL1C has been shown to interact with Valosin-containing protein.

References

Further reading